NS Puppis (NS Pup) is an irregular variable star in the constellation Puppis. Its apparent magnitude varies between 4.4 and 4.5.

NS Puppis is a naked eye star, given the h1 and the Bright Star Catalogue number 3225. It was considered to be a stable star until 1966.  It was given the variable star designation NS Puppis in 1975.

h2 Puppis is another luminous K-type star with almost the same visual magnitude about a degree to the southeast.

References

Puppis
K-type supergiants
Slow irregular variables
Puppis, NS
068553
3225
040091
Puppis, h1
Durchmusterung objects